Jeffrey Hollender (born 1954 in New York City) is an American entrepreneur, author and activist best known for founding Seventh Generation Inc.

Early life 
Hollender grew up in New York City and attended The Town School, The Allen-Stevenson School, Riverdale Country Day School, Putney School, and Santa Barbara High School. He graduated high school from the Baldwin School. Hollender attended Hampshire College for three semesters and did not graduate.

Career 
From 1976 to 1978, Hollender founded and served as CEO of the Skills Exchange of Toronto, a not-for-profit which offered evening and weekend classes. In 1979, Hollender was the president of Network for Learning and Warner Audio Publishing.

Seventh Generation, Inc. 
In 1988, Hollender and Alan Newman acquired a small mail order catalog centered on energy conservation products known as Renew America, which eventually transformed into Seventh Generation Inc. The company sells eco-friendly household products. It reached $8 million in sales within three years of operation. 

In June 2009, Hollender stepped down from his role as CEO and became Executive Chairperson of Seventh Generation. Hollender was fired from Seventh Generation by the board of directors in October 2010.

Leadership 
In 2009, Hollender co-founded the American Sustainable Business Council, which describes itself as a "growing coalition of business networks committed to public policies that support a vibrant, just, and sustainable economy." It claims to be "a national partnership of 57+ business associations representing over 150,000 businesses and 300,000 entrepreneurs, managers, investors, and others. These partners support sustainable , socially responsible business practices, and strong local Main Street economies."

Hollender has served on the board of Greenpeace USA since 2005 and as co-chair of the Board of Directors since 2010. He also has served on the board of Verite, Health Care Without Harm, and Practically Green.

Sustain Natural 
In 2013, Hollender and his daughter Meika Hollender started Sustain Natural, a sexual wellness company that provides sustainable, fair trade, and non-toxic condoms. Hollender got the idea for the company while surfing. The Hollenders approached more than 25 venture capital firms looking for backing but did not receive investments. Instead, they started the company with money from themselves, family, and friends. Sustain Natural was acquired by Grove Collaborative in 2019 for an undisclosed sum.

Writing 
Hollender has written six books on corporate responsibility and sustainable practices. Hollender's writing has been published in academic journals such as the Stanford Social Innovation Review.  
 How to Make the World a Better Place (1985) coauthored by Linda Catling
 Naturally Clean (2006) coauthored by Geoff Davis and Meika Hollender
 In Our Every Deliberation: An Introduction to Seventh Generation (2006)
 What Matters Most (2006)
 The Responsibility Revolution: How the Next Generation of Businesses Will Win (2010) coauthored by Bill Breen
 Planet Home (2010) coauthored by Alexandra Zissu

Recognition
 2004 Terry Ehrich Award
 Fast Company Fast 50
 Winning Workplaces' Best Bosses Award 2006 (sponsored by FORTUNE)
 2012 NYU Stern's Citi Leadership & Ethics Program Distinguished Fellow

References

External links
 Jeffrey Hollender official website
 The Inspired Protagonist - Jeffrey Hollender's official blog
 Sustain Natural

1954 births
Living people
Hampshire College alumni
The Putney School alumni
American chief executives